Tennman Records was an American record label created as a joint venture between Justin Timberlake and Interscope Records.

History
The label was announced in a press release dated May 28, 2007.

"We are all excited about the talent we have to offer already on our roster and I cannot wait to introduce the world to my new discoveries," Timberlake said in a statement.

Ten-time Grammy Award winner Justin Timberlake serves as the company's Chairman and Chief Executive Officer.  Justin sets the company's creative direction and is actively involved in all phases of the label's operations.

Andre Person serves as the company's President.  Navin Watumull serves as the company's General Manager/Vice President of A&R.

Dutch YouTube celebrity Esmée Denters was the first artist to be signed to the new label. On June 6, 2007, the company announced she would be opening for Justin Timberlake at six venues during his 2007 European tour.

Roster
FreeSol

Albums
Esmée Denters - Outta Here (2009)
Matt Morris - When Everything Breaks Open (2010)
FreeSol - No Rules (TBR)

References

External links
 Official site

Record labels established in 2007
Record labels disestablished in 2013
American record labels
Labels distributed by Universal Music Group
Justin Timberlake